Liancalus is a genus of flies in the family Dolichopodidae. It contains at least 21 species distributed worldwide except in Australasia and Oceania. The genus includes some of the largest species in the family, with body length approaching 12 mm in some species.

Nomenclature
Liancalus Loew, 1857 is a replacement name for Anoplomerus Rondani, 1856, which was preoccupied by a beetle genus. However, the name Liancalus is threatened by a change in type species of Anoplomerus from "Hydrophorus Regius Fabr." (now Liancalus virens (Scopoli, 1763)) to "Hydrophorus Notatus Meig." (now Scellus notatus (Fabricius, 1781)), made in an overlooked unpaginated corrigendum on the last page of Rondani, 1856, which would make Liancalus a synonym of Scellus. An application to the ICZN was made to conserve the names Liancalus and Scellus by designating Dolichopus regius Fabricius, 1805 as the type species of Anoplomerus. This was accepted by the ICZN in 2018.

Species

Liancalus adenensis Dyte, 1967
Liancalus benedictus Becker, 1922
Liancalus dytei Negrobov, Grootaert & Coulibaly, 1987
Liancalus genualis Loew, 1861
Liancalus glaucus Becker, 1908
Liancalus hydrophilus Aldrich, 1893
Liancalus lasius Wei & Liu, 1995
Liancalus limbatus Van Duzee, 1917
Liancalus lobatus Parent, 1932
Liancalus maculosus Yang, 1998
Liancalus peringueyi Curran, 1926
Liancalus pterodactyl Runyon & Hurley, 2015
Liancalus quadrisetus Dyte, 1967
Liancalus querulus Osten Sacken, 1877
Liancalus shandonganus Yang, 1998
Liancalus similis Aldrich, 1893
Liancalus sinensis Yang, 1998
Liancalus sonorus Runyon & Hurley, 2015
Liancalus vaillanti Dyte, 1967
Liancalus virens (Scopoli, 1763)
Liancalus zhenzhuristi Negrobov, 1979

The following are synonyms of other species:
Liancalus decolor Parent, 1939: synonym of Liancalus peringueyi Curran, 1926

References

Dolichopodidae genera
Hydrophorinae
Taxa named by Hermann Loew